Nuneham House is an eighteenth century villa in the Palladian style, set in parkland at Nuneham Courtenay in Oxfordshire, England. It is currently owned by Oxford University and is used as a retreat centre by the Brahma Kumaris World Spiritual University. In September 2016 the house and a thousand acres of surrounding parkland and farmland, including the village of Nuneham Courtenay, were put up for sale in three separate lots for a total of £22 million.
 
The house was built in 1756 on the site of an earlier property and surrounding village by Stiff Leadbetter for Simon Harcourt, 1st Earl Harcourt.  Interiors were designed by James Stuart and Lancelot "Capability" Brown designed the landscaped grounds. It is a Grade II* listed building.

Lord Harcourt demolished the original village of Nuneham Courtenay in the 1760s in order to create a landscaped park around his new villa, removing the existing village in its entirety, rebuilding it and diverting the main Oxford to London road (now the A4074). Oliver Goldsmith wrote of the demolition of the village and destruction of its farms to clear land to become this wealthy man's garden  in his poem The Deserted Village. Published in 1770, it expresses a fear that the destruction of villages and the conversion of land from productive agriculture to ornamental landscape gardens would ruin the peasantry. Goldsmith gave his Deserted Village the pseudonym "Sweet Auburn", but did not disclose the real village to which it refers.

The house was altered by Henry Holland in 1781–2, including the heightening of the wings. In 1789, the 2nd Earl Harcourt re-erected the Carfax Conduit building in a prominent position in the park. It had had to be moved from Carfax in the centre of Oxford, where it was an obstacle to traffic.

In 1904, after the death of Sir William Harcourt, Nuneham House passed to his son, Lewis Harcourt, known by many as "Loulou". He had recently married Mary Ethel Burns, a niece of American financier and banker, J. P. Morgan. The estate inherited by the young couple was in need of major renovation, which they could not afford. Morgan established a £52,000 ($260,000) line of credit at his London bank for his niece, which he told her did not need to be repaid. The Harcourts used these funds to renovate the old buildings and grounds.

During the Second World War, Nuneham House and its surrounding parkland was requisitioned by the Air Ministry and became RAF Nuneham Park, a P.R.I.U. or photographic reconnaissance interpretation unit. Photographs taken by aircraft from RAF Benson and other airfields over enemy territory were examined here by RAF officers as well as small contingents from the Army, Royal Navy and the USAAF. Nissen huts and other, larger buildings were erected adjacent to the mansion, including a camp cinema which villagers were welcome to attend. The RAF station continued after the war in the same role until the mid-1950s, when the added buildings and roadways were demolished and the estate handed back to the Harcourt family, who sold it to Oxford University.

The Harcourt Arboretum, part of the tree and plant collection of the University of Oxford Botanic Garden, occupies part of what were the grounds of Nuneham House.

The landscaped parkland and pleasure gardens surrounding the house are listed Grade I on the Register of Historic Parks and Gardens.

The estate includes the privately owned, two-storey Old Rectory, built in 1759 on the northern boundary by the first Earl. It was Grade-II listed in 1963 as part of the "Nuneham Courtney Park and Garden".

References

Sources

English Heritage; Images of England, detailed architectural description

External links

Official website - Global Retreat Centre
Nuneham House entry from The DiCamillo Companion to British & Irish Country Houses
"View of Nuneham Courtenay from the Thames" (1787) — painting by Joseph Mallord William Turner (1775–1851) at Tate Online

Buildings by Stiff Leadbetter
Country houses in Oxfordshire
Grade I listed parks and gardens in Oxfordshire
Grade II* listed buildings in Oxfordshire
Grade II* listed houses
Houses completed in 1756
South Oxfordshire District